The International Monitoring Team (IMT) was a monitoring team composed of 60 members headquartered in Cotabato City, Mindanao of the Philippines to monitor the implementation of peace between the Government of the Philippines (GPH) and one of the largest rebels in the region, the Moro Islamic Liberation Front (MILF) in the Moro conflict. The team is led by Malaysia, followed by Brunei Darussalam, Indonesia, Japan, Libya, Norway and subsequently the European Union.

History 
The IMT was launched in October 2004 by Malaysia together with Brunei and Libya to oversee the situation after the GPH and MILF signed their ceasefire agreement in 2003. In October 2006, Japan began to join the monitoring team. Armed conflict however still resumed and the security situation deteriorated until August 2008 when the national co-ordination surrounding resolutions of pending land problems failed. During the period, the lead was taken by Libya which then rose skepticism from the MILF over the slowing process. Malaysia then decided to withdraw its contingent in November 2008 and the IMT temporarily suspended its activities in 2009. The IMT became active again in February 2010, the same year when Norway began to join the monitoring team. Indonesia also joined the IMT in 2011 after being invited by the Philippines in 2009.

The Moro Islamic Liberation Front would sign the Comprehensive Agreement on the Bangsamoro in 2014. This in turn led to Bangsamoro autonomous region being formed in the southern Philippines in 2019 as part of the peace process. In March 2022, the Philippine government led by President Rodrigo Duterte informed that the IMT that it would no longer extend its mission. The IMT officially left the Philippines in June 2022.

At its peak the IMT had 60 personnel but this figure gradually decreased over time.

Roles 
IMT was responsible in monitoring the security, humanitarian, rehabilitation and development aspects, as well as socio-economic assistance and civilian protection.

Areas coverage 
IMT covered the areas of:
 Zamboanga del Norte
 Zamboanga Sibugay
 Zamboanga del Sur
 Maguindanao
 North Cotabato
 South Cotabato
 Bukidnon
 Lanao del Norte
 Lanao del Sur
 Sultan Kudarat
 Sarangani
 Davao del Norte
 Compostela Valley
 Davao del Sur
 Davao Oriental
 Basilan
 Sulu
 Tawi-Tawi
 Palawan

References 

Foreign relations of the Philippines
Cotabato City
2004 establishments in the Philippines
Peacekeeping
2022 disestablishments in the Philippines